Umma is a genus of damselflies belonging to the family Calopterygidae.

Species include:

Umma cincta  – Broad-winged Sparklewing
Umma declivium  – Green-banded Sparklewing
Umma electa  – Metallic Sparklewing
Umma femina  – Angola Sparklewing
Umma gumma  
Umma infumosa  (syn. Sapho infumosa)
Umma longistigma  – Bare-bellied Sparklewing
Umma mesostigma  – Hairy-bellied Sparklewing
Umma mesumbei  – Cameroon Sparklewing
Umma purpurea  – Purple Sparklewing
Umma saphirina  – Sapphire Sparklewing

References

Calopterygidae
Zygoptera genera
Taxa named by William Forsell Kirby